Fernwood 2 Night (or Fernwood Tonight)  is a satirical comedy talk show that was broadcast weeknights from July to September 1977. It was created by Norman Lear and produced by Alan Thicke as a spin-off and summer replacement for Mary Hartman, Mary Hartman. It was hosted by Barth Gimble (Martin Mull) and sidekick–announcer Jerry Hubbard (Fred Willard), complete with a stage band, Happy Kyne and the Mirth Makers, with Frank De Vol as the dour bandleader and Tommy Tedesco as a guitarist.

Overview and production
Fernwood 2 Night was ironic in tone and set in the fictional small town of Fernwood, Ohio, like Mary Hartman, Mary Hartman, in which Mull portrayed Barth's twin brother Garth Gimble, who was impaled on an aluminum christmas tree. Fernwood 2 night parodied actual late-night talk shows and the sort of fare one might expect from locally produced small-town midwestern American television programming. It was one of the first satires of television talk shows, foreshadowing the likes of The Larry Sanders Show, Space Ghost Coast to Coast, and Comedy Bang! Bang!.

After one summer season of Fernwood 2 Night, the producers revamped the show in 1978 as America 2 Night. In this second version, the show relocated to Southern California (specifically, the fictional city of "Alta Coma") and was broadcast nationally on the fictional UBS Network. The change to a Southern California setting made it more plausible for real-life celebrities to appear on the program as themselves.

In 2001, Mull and Willard reprised their roles in a stage appearance and retrospective at the US Comedy Arts Festival in Aspen, Colorado. The pair also worked together in other projects, appearing together as a gay couple in the final seasons of Roseanne.

Reruns of Fernwood and America 2 Night were broadcast  on Nick at Nite from 1990 to 1993 and TV Land in 2002 as part of their "TV Land Kitschen" block, also hosted by Mull and Willard.
Both Fernwood 2 Night and America 2 Night have never been officially released on home video in any format.

Recurring characters
Merle Jeeter (Dabney Coleman), Fernwood's somewhat shifty, self-promoting mayor.
William W.D. 'Bud' Prize (Kenneth Mars), Fernwood's "Ambassador at Large" from the Chamber of Commerce and the Mayor's supposed energy expert. Prize invariably arrived wearing his elaborate "chinodontic" headgear which was designed to correct his underbite. 
Tony Rolletti (Bill Kirchenbauer), an enthusiastic, if only marginally talented, lounge singer.
Susan Cloud (Susan Elliot), the spaced-out owner of the Butterfly Deli, a local health food restaurant. 
Virgil Simms (Jim Varney), the local mechanic who offered automotive advice. 
Garth Gimble Sr. (Robert Williams), Barth's father, who was also the cheerfully incompetent studio security guard. Almost always seen with his lethargic dog Louie.
Lou Moffat (Lou Felder), a "consumer affairs expert" who always ended up plugging products distributed by Gimbleco Enterprises.
Debbie Dunbar (Kathy McCullen), Fernwood's controversial high school  "Spanking Girl."
Lillian Dunbar (Bobbie Tremain), Debbie's outraged mother.
Dr. Richard Osgood/Van Moot (Craig Richard Nelson), a physician and research scientist who discovered that leisure suits cause cancer.

See also
 List of late night network TV programs

References

External links

1977 American television series debuts
1977 American television series endings
1970s American satirical television series
1970s American sitcoms
First-run syndicated television programs in the United States
Television series by Sony Pictures Television
American television spin-offs
Television shows set in Ohio
Television series created by Norman Lear